Otto Nückel (Cologne, 6 September 1888 – Cologne, 12 November 1955) was a German painter, graphic designer, illustrator and cartoonist. He is best known as one of the 20th century's pioneer wordless novelists, along with Frans Masereel and Lynd Ward.

Life 

Nückel, who had exhibited skill as an artist in his childhood, dropped out of medical school in Freiburg im Breisgau and moved to Munich where he resided for the remainder of his life. There he developed his skill in drawing and painting, joining the artists' association, the Munich Sezession, and developing an interest in relief printing. Because of the scarcity of wood, Nückel made engravings for relief prints on lead plates. A pioneer in lead engraving, Nückel developed an accomplished mastery of this medium, distinguished by ample use of the multiple-line tool. He illustrated works by Thomas Mann, E. T. A. Hoffmann and others before garnering considerable attention with his own publication Destiny: A story in pictures (Schicksal.  Eine Geschicte in Bildern. Munich: Delphin Verlag, 1930). This wordless novel highlights the life and suffering of a female protagonist as a vehicle for a dark social critique. Much of Nückel's work favors dark comedy, profound irony and an often scathing sarcasm.

Nückel's series of "Studio Visits" (Atelierbesuche) to studios from Ensor to Bosch were famous. Nückel earned his living as an illustrator and cartoonist. He was a contributor to the satirical magazines Simplicissimus and Simpl, fantasy magazine Der Orchideengarten,
 and to children's periodical Ping-Pong.

New editions of Destiny have been published in the US by Dover and in France under the title 'Destin' in 2005 (Éditions IMHO, Paris) and in 2021 (Éditions Ici-bas, Toulouse).

Work

As illustrator
Nückel provided illustrations for these books, among others:
 A. M. Frey, Solneman der Unsichtbare (woodcuts), Delphin Verlag, München, 1914
 A. M. Frey, Spuk des Alltags (woodcuts), Delphin Verlag, München, 1920
 Thomas Mann, Der kleine Herr Friedemann (woodcuts), Phantasus-Verlag, München, 1920
 Clemens Brentano, Das Märchen vom Schulmeister Klopfstock (wood engravings), Freitag-Verlag, München. 1947
 Stefan Andres, Vom heiligen Pfäfflein Domenico (wood engravings), Paul List Verlag, München, 1966

As author/illustrator

 Otto Nückel. Eine Würdigung von Willy Seidel. München 1930

Exhibitions 

 Lenbachhaus, München 1956
 Berufsverband bildender Künstler, München 1965
 EP Galerie, Düsseldorf 2005

References

External links 
 Otto Nückel in the German National Library catalogue

German satirists
German cartoonists
German engravers
German printmakers
German graphic designers
20th-century German painters
20th-century German male artists
German comics artists
1888 births
1955 deaths
20th-century German novelists